Shkodran Mustafi (born 17 April 1992) is a German professional footballer who plays as a centre-back for Segunda División club Levante.

Mustafi began his career in the youth ranks of Hamburger SV and English club Everton, where he made one substitute appearance for them before leaving to Sampdoria in January 2012. He signed a five-year deal at Valencia in August 2014, and moved to Arsenal for a reported £35 million two years later. He played 151 games for Arsenal. He later returned to the Bundesliga with Schalke 04 and La Liga with Levante.

Mustafi made his full international debut against Poland on 13 May 2014, and was part of the German teams that won the 2014 FIFA World Cup and the 2017 FIFA Confederations Cup, also competing at UEFA Euro 2016.

Club career

Early career
Mustafi was born in Bad Hersfeld, Hesse, to a Macedonian Albanian family originally from Gostivar in the former Yugoslavia. Mustafi started his career in the youth system of local 1. FC Bebra, and had a stint with SV Rotenburg, before joining Hamburger SV's youth setup in 2006.

Everton

In May 2009, Mustafi joined Everton, initially assigned to the academy team. He later stated that "Goodison Park feels like home", after turning down offers from Manchester City and Newcastle United.

Mustafi made his competitive debut on 16 December 2009, replacing Tony Hibbert in the 75th minute of a 0–1 home loss against BATE Borisov, for the season's UEFA Europa League. He was also named on the bench for the Premier League matches against Arsenal and Manchester City in January. Mustafi only appeared on the bench nine times in the following two campaigns, but never played in any further matches.

Sampdoria
In January 2012, Mustafi moved to Italian Serie B side Sampdoria, on a free transfer. Mustafi was released by Everton after he asked manager David Moyes to allow him to move on for more game time.

Mustafi made his Samp debut on 26 May 2012, starting and playing the full 90 minutes of a 1–3 loss at Varese. It was his maiden appearance in the competition, as Sampdoria returned to Serie A at first attempt. He made his debut in the Italian top flight on 11 November 2012, starting in a 0–2 loss at Palermo.

On 26 October of the following year he scored his first professional goal, netting the game's only against Atalanta at the Stadio Luigi Ferraris.

Valencia

On 7 August 2014, Mustafi signed a five-year deal with La Liga's Valencia CF, for an undisclosed fee, rumoured to be €8 million. He debuted for his new team on 25 September, against Córdoba in an eventual 3–0 home win. A month later, he scored his first goal for the team, opening a 3–1 home win over Elche. In Valencia's next match on 2 November, against another regional rival, Villarreal, Mustafi scored a brace in a 3–1 away win to put Valencia into second place in the league.

On 3 March 2016, Mustafi received a straight red card in the first half of Valencia's 7–0 loss at Barcelona in the first leg of the Copa del Rey semi-final, after conceding a penalty with a foul on Lionel Messi. He then pleaded for the team's forgiveness by the Che supporters.

Arsenal
On 30 August 2016, Mustafi joined English club Arsenal for an undisclosed fee, reported to be in excess of £35 million. He made his debut in Arsenal's 2–1 Premier League win over Southampton at the Emirates Stadium on 10 September. Mustafi beat Bacary Sagna's record unbeaten start of 17 games at the club in Arsenal's 3–3 draw against Bournemouth with his 18th game without defeat. On 22 January 2017, he scored his first goal for the club in a home 2–1 league win over Burnley. Because of illness, he missed Arsenal's 2–1 win over Chelsea in the 2017 FA Cup Final on 27 May.

Mustafi was in the starting 11 against Manchester City in the EFL Cup final on 25 February 2018. He made a mistake in the 18th minute that allowed Sergio Agüero to score the first goal of a 3–0 City win. On 29 May 2019, he was an unused substitute in the Europa League final against Chelsea, in which Arsenal were defeated 4–1. He missed the 2020 FA Cup Final against the same team due to a hamstring injury, and Arsenal won 2–1.

On 29 August 2020, Mustafi missed Arsenal's victory over Liverpool in the 2020 FA Community Shield because of injury. The following 1 February, Arsenal and Mustafi reached a mutual agreement to terminate his contract. During his tenure at Arsenal, he developed a reputation for errors.

Schalke 04 
On 1 February 2021, Mustafi joined German side Schalke 04 on a permanent transfer. He was reportedly signed as the replacement for Liverpool-bound Ozan Kabak on a six-month contract. He made his debut five days later in a 0–3 defeat against RB Leipzig in the Bundesliga. He played 13 games for the team from Gelsenkirchen, scoring in a 4–2 loss at Hoffenheim on 8 May.

Levante 
On 2 September 2021, Mustafi returned to the city of Valencia, joining La Liga club Levante on a two-year deal. He suffered from several injuries and made only 11 appearances as the team suffered relegation; this included three months with a knee injury from December to March 2022, followed by a quadriceps strain between April and July. His one goal was the early opener in a 3–1 loss at Real Betis on 28 November 2021.

International career

Eligible to represent Germany, North Macedonia and Albania, Mustafi played for his country of birth at youth level; with the under-17 team he won the 2009 UEFA European Under-17 Championship.

Joachim Löw called up Mustafi to the German national squad for a friendly match against Chile in February 2014, he made his full international debut in a friendly match against Poland, playing the full 90 minutes of a goalless draw at the Volksparkstadion on 13 May 2014.

Mustafi was selected in Germany's 30-man provisional squad before the 2014 FIFA World Cup by Löw. After initially not making the squad for the finals, he was subsequently nominated as the replacement for the injured Marco Reus. He appeared as a substitute in Germany's opening World Cup game against Portugal, coming on in the 73rd minute in place of Mats Hummels to win his second cap.

In the team's second match, he again came on as a substitute, replacing Jérôme Boateng at half time against Ghana. He was selected to start at right-back in Germany's round of 16 match against Algeria, but was substituted in the 70th minute for Sami Khedira due to an injury in his left thigh. It was later confirmed by the DFB that Mustafi would take no further part in the World Cup due to the torn fibre muscle.

Mustafi was also called up for UEFA Euro 2016. In Germany's opening match against Ukraine in Lille, he headed a delivery from Toni Kroos to open a 2–0 win. That was his first goal for Germany. He was also part of their squad that won the 2017 FIFA Confederations Cup in Russia, but was omitted from the following year's World Cup in the same country due to a poor season with Arsenal.

Personal life
Mustafi is an ethnic Albanian from Gostivar, North Macedonia. He was born and grew up in Germany and holds both Albanian and German citizenship. Mustafi is a practising Muslim. In July 2016, he married Albanian model Vjosa Kaba in Gostivar. The couple has a daughter, Noemi (born in July 2017), and a son, Amar (born in January 2019).

Career statistics

Club

International

As of match played 8 October 2017. Germany score listed first, score column indicates score after each Mustafi goal.

Honours

Arsenal
FA Cup: 2016–17, 2019–20
EFL Cup runner-up: 2017–18
UEFA Europa League runner-up: 2018–19

Germany U17
UEFA European Under-17 Championship: 2009

Germany
FIFA World Cup: 2014
FIFA Confederations Cup: 2017

References

External links

Profile at the Arsenal F.C. website

1992 births
Living people
People from Bad Hersfeld
Sportspeople from Kassel (region)
Footballers from Hesse
German footballers
Germany youth international footballers
Germany under-21 international footballers
Germany international footballers
Association football defenders
Everton F.C. players
U.C. Sampdoria players
Valencia CF players
Arsenal F.C. players
FC Schalke 04 players
Levante UD footballers
Serie B players
Serie A players
La Liga players
Premier League players
Bundesliga players
2014 FIFA World Cup players
UEFA Euro 2016 players
2017 FIFA Confederations Cup players
FIFA World Cup-winning players
FIFA Confederations Cup-winning players
German expatriate footballers
Expatriate footballers in England
Expatriate footballers in Italy
Expatriate footballers in Spain
German expatriate sportspeople in England
German expatriate sportspeople in Italy
German expatriate sportspeople in Spain
German people of Albanian descent
German people of Macedonian descent
German Muslims
Macedonian Muslims
Albanian Muslims
Albanians in North Macedonia
People from Gostivar